The German is a short film written and directed by Nick Ryan, Starring Toby Kebbell and Christian Brassington. It premiered at the 2008 Cork Film Festival and has subsequently been screened at Palm Springs Film Festival, LA Shorts Fest and São Paulo International Film Festival.

Synopsis

In November 1940, during the Battle of Britain, a duel unfolds between two ace pilots, each willing to take the match to its ultimate conclusion. Unknown to the pilots is a fate neither has considered. They crash-land in neutral Ireland, and both are captured by the Irish Defense Forces. On the truck bringing them into custody, the German pilot offers a cigarette to the Englishman. After a few seconds of surprise, he accepts. They both understand that the war is over for them.

External links 

NICK RYAN TAKES TO THE SKIES WITH THE GERMAN, twitchfilm.net

2008 short films
2008 films
Irish short films
Battle of Britain films
English-language Irish films